Tsentralnyi District is an urban district of the city of Dnipro, in southern Ukraine. It is located in the city's center and on the right-bank of the Dnieper River.

History
The district was originally created in 1932 as the Tsentralnyi Nahornyi District. on 2 December 1934, after the death of Sergei Kirov, it was renamed as the Kirovskyi District. In 1936 the eastern part of district became the Zhovtnevyi District. In 1973 more territories of the Kirovskyi District were passed to the newly formed Babushkinskyi District. The district gained its current name, Tsentralnyi District, on 27 November 2015 when it was renamed as part of Ukraine's decommunization campaign.

Gallery

References

External links

 Tsentralnyi Raion at the Dnipro City Council website 

Urban districts of Dnipro
States and territories established in 1932
1932 establishments in Ukraine